Angkatan Kampong Setia Bersatu Football Club or simply AKSE Bersatu FC is a football club in Brunei, playing in the Brunei Super League. The club originates from the twin villages of Setia in Sungai Kebun, Kampong Ayer.

History
AKSE Bersatu was founded in 2012 from the merging of two Brunei-Muara district clubs namely Persatuan AKSE (Setia Village Community Association) and Setia Bersatu. They were well-established clubs which presence was limited to district level competition. The newly formed team entered the 2012 Brunei FA Cup in the first round where they were eliminated by eventual winners MS ABDB.

They have been members of the Brunei-Muara District League since 2015, reaching a third-place finish in 2018. After two cancelled district league campaigns, they became the winner of the 2022 edition by beating Ar Rawda in the final by 3 goals to nil, essentially winning promotion to the Brunei Super League.

The current main sponsor of the club is HiTune Group of Companies, a property and real estate developer among others.

Current squad

Honours
 Brunei-Muara District League: 2022

References

External links
 

Football clubs in Brunei
Association football clubs established in 2012
2012 establishments in Brunei